Joy Dorothy Coghill-Thorne, CM, (May 13, 1926 – January 20, 2017) was a Canadian actress, director, and writer. Her obituary in The Vancouver Sun described her as having had "a seven-decade run at the top of the Vancouver theatre world."

Early life and education
Coghill was born in Findlater, Saskatchewan, Canada on May 13, 1926, the daughter of J.G. Coghill and Dorothy Pollard Coghill. Her father was a Presbyterian minister. She was educated at King's Park Secondary School and Queen's Park Secondary School in Glasgow, Scotland. After returning to Canada, she attended Kitsilano Secondary School and began performing in school theatre productions. She earned a Bachelor of Arts degree from the University of British Columbia in 1949 and a Master of Fine Arts degree from the Art Institute of Chicago in 1951.

Career
Coghill and Myra Benson founded Canada's first professional touring children's theatre, Holiday Theatre in 1953. From 1967 to 1969, Coghill was the artistic director of the Vancouver Playhouse. She was the first woman to hold that position. In 1994, Coghill founded Western Gold, a theatre company for senior professional actors in Vancouver. She also served as a director for the National Theatre School's English drama section in 1960. She held honorary degrees from Simon Fraser University and the University of British Columbia. 

Her best-known work is Song of This Place, a play about the Canadian artist Emily Carr. In addition to her writing, Coghill has made guest appearances on Da Vinci's Inquest as Portia Da Vinci and as the dying human host Saroosh/Selmak on the Stargate SG-1 episode "The Tok'ra, Part 1 & 2".

Coghill received four Jessie Richardson Theatre Awards for her theatrical accomplishments in Vancouver, British Columbia: Vancouver Professional Theatre Alliance Award (1988–1989), Community Recognition Award (1989–1990), Outstanding Performance by an Actress in a Leading Role (1990–1991), and Unique Mandate and Contribution to the Theatre Community (1998–1999).

Other awards include a Governor General's Performing Arts Award for Lifetime Artistic Achievement, the Gemini Humanitarian Award, the Dominion Drama Festival acting award and a Canadian drama award. On October 25, 1990, she was made a member of the Order of Canada and cited as "a champion of Canadian talent and quality and as "a continuing inspiration to her colleagues in theatre throughout the country."

Personal life
Coghill was married to John Thorne, a producer for the Canadian Broadcasting Corporation. On January 20, 2017, Coghill died of massive heart failure at St. Paul's Hospital, Vancouver, British Columbia, Canada. She was 90. She was survived by three children and two grandchildren.

Plays 

 Song of This Place

Filmography

Film

Television

References

External links
 Canadian Theatre Encyclopedia biography
 CBC's The National: Joy Coghill's Story
 
 Joy Coghill at Doollee.com

1926 births
2017 deaths
Actresses from Saskatchewan
Canadian women dramatists and playwrights
Canadian film actresses
Canadian television actresses
Canadian voice actresses
Writers from Saskatchewan
Governor General's Performing Arts Award winners
20th-century Canadian dramatists and playwrights
20th-century Canadian women writers
Canadian stage actresses
Members of the Order of Canada
Canadian artistic directors
Canadian theatre directors
University of British Columbia alumni